In video games, an open world is a game mechanic of using a virtual world that the player can explore and approach objectives freely.

Open world may also refer to:
 Open world assumption, a knowledge representation assumption in formal logic
 Open World Entertainment, a South Korean independent record label and talent management company
 Open World Forum,  an annual event on open source innovation in Paris, France
 Open World Program, ten-day program which brings emerging leaders from Eurasia to the United States to engage with professional counterparts (administered by the Open World Leadership Center)
 Open World Press, a US publisher of role-playing games
 Open World, the working title of the 2019 superhero film Captain Marvel